Tosun Terzioğlu (13 March 1942 − 23 February 2016) was a Turkish mathematician and academic administrator.

Terzioğlu was born in İstanbul, Turkey. He graduated from Robert College in 1961. He studied mathematics at Newcastle University, UK and received his BS in 1965. He earned his PhD from Frankfurt University in Germany in 1968. Between 1968-1994, he taught at Middle East Technical University (METU) in Ankara. He worked as a visiting professor at the University of Michigan between 1975–1976 and University of Wuppertal in Germany between 1982-1983. He had been the president of the Scientific and Technological Research Council of Turkey (TÜBİTAK) between 1992-1997. He was later the president of Sabancı University, Istanbul. He died at the age of 74 at  Istanbul in 2016.

His father, Nazim Terzioglu was also a  mathematician.

References

External links
His entry in Sabanci University's directory
 Curriculum vitae

1942 births
2016 deaths
Turkish mathematicians
Academic staff of Sabancı University
Rectors of universities and colleges in Turkey
Goethe University Frankfurt alumni
Robert College alumni
University of Michigan faculty